Corn steep liquor is a by-product of corn wet-milling. A viscous concentrate of corn solubles which contains amino acids, vitamins and minerals, it is an important constituent of some growth media. It was used in the culturing of Penicillium during research into penicillin by American microbiologist Andrew J. Moyer. It is an excellent source of organic nitrogen.

Corn steep liquor has CAS number 66071-94-1 and EC Number 266-113-4.

References 

Maize products